Who Gets the Dog? is a one-off British television comedy-drama starring Kevin Whately, Alison Steadman, Stephen Mangan, and Emma Pierson. It was written by Guy Hibbert and directed by Nicholas Renton  and premiered on ITV on Sunday 2 December 2007 at 9pm.

Plot summary 
Jack and Jenny Evans have been married for 27 years but have hit a rough patch in their marriage, as Jack has been having an affair with coworker Pamela. The two decide to split despite the protestations of their daughter and both hire lawyers to represent them. During a meeting the two lawyers,  Steve Hollister and Tara Walker, find that they have a mutual attraction to one another. They also get a perverse sense of joy out of dragging out the divorce proceedings, especially as this means that they can bill for more hours. Jack and Jenny continue to argue, particularly as each wants to take custody of the family dog, Bounder.

Ultimately Steve and Tara's plot is uncovered by their superiors and foiled. Jack breaks up with Pamela and reunites with Jenny, much to their daughter's joy.

Cast
 Kevin Whately as Jack Evans
 Alison Steadman as Jenny Evans
 Stephen Mangan as Steve Hollister
 Emma Pierson as Tara Walker
 Sinead Matthews as Claire Evans
 Deborah Findlay as Pamela Wilson
 David Gillespie as Clive Collingwood
 Luke Mably as Hugo Delaney-Jones
 Martin Hutson as Oliver Steinberg
 Judy Flynn as Sue Sullivan
 Badi Uzzaman as Harry Singh

Production 
Emma Pierson commented on playing a villainous character, as she felt that "Playing a character like Tara is a way of unleashing the demons, being able to say things and behave in a way you wouldn't in real life. I like playing girls on screen who are tougher than me, so I don't have to be them in reality." Filming took place on the Isle of Man.

Release 
Who Gets the Dog? premiered  on ITV on Sunday 2 December 2007 at 9pm.

Reception 
Critical reception for Who Gets the Dog? was predominantly negative, with The Munster Express calling the film a "train wreck" and The Telegraph joking that they "feel sorry for any lawyers watching". The Guardian heavily criticized the film as "a truly terrible programme. While the writing either plodded or cartwheeled, the performances swung between adequate and desperate." The Independent was similarly critical, writing "It's the phrase "comedy drama" that is problematic, given a script that begins with attritional marital row and proceeds by way of nervous breakdowns, suicide attempts and cruel professional cynicism, to a rueful and unconvincing "happy" ending."

References

External links 
 

2007 British television series debuts
ITV television dramas
Television series by All3Media